Rushmi Chakravarthi (born 9 October 1977) is a former professional tennis player from India. She won a record 52 ITF titles, the highest number set by an Indian female player. She turned professional, after playing in the first round of the WTA Tour tournament Sunfeast Open, held at Kolkata in September 2005. Her last match on the ITF Circuit took place in June 2017 in Aurangabad.

Tennis career

2005–2010
She was predominantly an ITF Circuit player. In her career, Chakravarthi played on the WTA Tour on two occasions, at the Sunfeast Open in 2005 and 2006, losing in round one both times.

Her career highlight was winning four medals (of which two were gold) at the 2003 Afro-Asian Games. Rushmi has represented India at the Asian Games in 2002, 2006 and 2010.

Chakravarthi lost in the qualifying of the Malaysian Open. This was her only performance in a WTA tournament outside India.

She has also competed in the 2010 Commonwealth Games in Delhi, where she progressed to the quarterfinals by beating English Katie O'Brien, and won the doubles bronze medal with Sania Mirza.

2011
Chakravarthi partnered with compatriot Poojashree Venkatesha to win the ITF event in Muzaffarnagar.

2012
Chakravarthi was awarded a wildcard entry to the 2012 London Olympics along with Sania Mirza to play in women's doubles. The pair were beaten in a tight three-setter by Taiwanese pair of Hsieh Su-wei and Chuang Chia-jung in round one.

ITF Circuit finals

Singles: 24 (12–12)

Doubles: 73 (40–33)

References

External links
 
 
 

Living people
1977 births
Sportswomen from Hyderabad, India
Commonwealth Games bronze medallists for India
Indian female tennis players
Tennis players at the 2010 Asian Games
Tennis players at the 2010 Commonwealth Games
Tennis players at the 2012 Summer Olympics
Olympic tennis players of India
Tennis players at the 2002 Asian Games
Tennis players at the 2006 Asian Games
Commonwealth Games medallists in tennis
20th-century Indian women
20th-century Indian people
Racket sportspeople from Hyderabad, India
21st-century Indian women
21st-century Indian people
Asian Games competitors for India
Medallists at the 2010 Commonwealth Games